Upton is an unincorporated community in western Black Township, Posey County, in the U.S. state of Indiana.  It is located about 5 miles northwest of the city of Mt. Vernon, the county seat of Posey County.  Its elevation is 377 feet (146 m).

History
A post office was established at Upton in 1878, and remained in operation until 1904. The community was named for a settler who lived near the train depot.

Train wreck of 1905
Five persons were killed, including an engineer and eight others injured, in a head-on crash between two freight trains on the former L & N railroad just outside the settlement of Upton on July 15, 1905.  According to reports, a train dispatcher mistook the number of each train and after realizing that an error was made, contacted the operator via telephone in Upton to warn of the mistake.  A hastily summoned group attempted to flag each train; unfortunately before they could reach the tracks, the collision had already occurred.

References

Unincorporated communities in Posey County, Indiana
Unincorporated communities in Indiana